Goodman Group is an Australian integrated commercial and industrial property group that owns, develops and manages real estate. This includes warehouses, large scale logistics facilities, business and office parks globally.

History
The organisation was founded in 1989 as a private property trust focused on industrial properties, listing on the Australian Securities Exchange (ASX) in 1995 as Goodman Hardie Industrial Property Trust with eight properties valued at A$75 million. In 2000 the trust merged with Macquarie Industrial Trust and was renamed Macquarie Goodman Industrial Trust.

The organisation changed its name to Macquarie Goodman Group in 2005 following a series of acquisitions and mergers, which made it the largest industrial property group in the ASX All Ordinaries Index.
  
In July 2007, the organisation was renamed to its present name, after Macquarie Bank sold its 7.7% interest almost a year earlier. Goodman is now one of the largest providers of industrial property and business space in the world, following the expansion of its operations into Europe, Asia and the Americas through a series of acquisitions and organic growth.

As of 30 June 2020, the Group had 392 properties under management in 17 countries and 19.3 million sqm under management. It had market capitalisation of A$27.2 billion.

The Group delivered operating profit of $1,060.2 million as of 30 June 2020, up 12.5% on FY19, and operating earnings per security (EPS) of 57.5 cents, up 11.4% on FY19. It is split into three divisions: property portfolio, development and funds management.

On 30 June 2020, Goodman Group reported A$51.6 billion Assets Under Management, with A$6.5 billion in development work in progress.

Goodman UK

Goodman UK is part of the Goodman Group integrated industrial property development and management company. The company specialises in the developing and managing of Business, Science and Commercial Parks. Goodman UK has a number of parks situated throughout the United Kingdom, these include the following:

Arlington Business Park
Arlington Square, Bracknell
Birmingham Business Park
Colton Square Business Park
Gloucester Business Park
Harwell Science Park
Leeds Valley Park is a business park owned by Goodman UK. The park is 50 acres in size and is three miles south of Leeds city centre. The developer Akeler managed the building of the park, which has three buildings and was designed by the architectural firm Aukett Europe.
Oxford Business Park
Rainton Bridge Business Park

See also
Prologis
Stockland
GPT Group
Lend Lease Corporation

References

External links
 

Companies listed on the Australian Securities Exchange
Real estate companies of Australia
Companies based in Sydney
Real estate companies established in 1989
Australian companies established in 1989